Adolf Edgar Licho (born Adolf Edgar Lichowetzer; 13 September 1876 – 11 October 1944) was a Russian-German actor, screenwriter, and film director. He was born of Jewish parentage in Kremenchug which was then part of the Russian Empire, but emigrated to Germany to work in the theatre and then later in silent films. Following the Nazi Party's takeover in 1933 he went into exile, first in Austria and France and later in the United States. In Hollywood he played minor roles until his death in 1944.

Selected filmography

 Schuldig (1913)
 The Seeds of Life (1918) - Treugold, Literat
 Doktor Palmore. Der schleichende Tod (1918) - Doktor Palmore
 The Yellow Ticket (1918, Short) - Professor Stanlaus
 The Foreign Prince (1918) - Der Varietedirektor
 Der Todesschacht (1920)
 The Red Poster (1920) - Emil Storch (Artist)
 Leben und Lüge (1920) - Margulin
 The White Peacock (1920) - Variétéwirt
 Whitechapel (1920) - Brillantenhändler van Zuider
 Madame Récamier (1920) - Robert
 Die sieben Todsünden (1920)
 From Morn to Midnight (1920) - Fatter Herr
 Der Erbe der van Diemen (1921) - Großkapitalist
 Off the Rails (1921)
 Fahrendes Volk (1921)
 Roswolsky's Mistress (1921) - Theaterdirektor
 Das rote Plakat, 2. Teil - Die eiserne Acht (1921) - Emil Storch
 Wandering Souls (1921) - Herr Lebedoff
 Anna Maria (1921)
 The Fateful Day (1921, Director)
 The Golden Net (1922)
 Women's Sacrifice (1922) - Alter Boheme
 Kinder der Zeit (1922)
 The Count of Charolais (1922) - Wucherer
 Lucrezia Borgia (1922) - Lodowico
 The Game with Women (1922, Director)
 Kaddish (1924)
 Comedians (1925) - Charkterspieler
 The Humble Man and the Chanteuse (1925)
 The City of Temptation (1925)
 The Adventures of Sybil Brent (1925) - Pötter, Direktor des Theatrs
 The Adventure of Mr. Philip Collins (1926) - President Cuffler, Daisys Vater
 His Late Excellency (1927)
 The Love of Jeanne Ney (1927) - Raymond Ney
 Luther (1928) - (uncredited)
 Charlotte Somewhat Crazy (1928, Director)
 Scandal in Baden-Baden (1929) - Agent
 My Daughter's Tutor (1930) - Rabbiner
 Alraune (1930) - Attorney-at-law Manasse
 1914 (1931) - Suchomlinow
 Grock (1931) - 1. Nichtkäufer
 Men Behind Bars (1931) - Annies Vater
 The Eaglet (1931, Writer)
 The Duke of Reichstadt (1931, Writer)
 Victoria and Her Hussar (1931) - Birinski
 Peace of Mind (1931) - Lotte Fiedlers Vater
 The Testament of Dr. Mabuse (1933) - Dr. Hauser
 The Big Bluff (1933) - Paradieser
 Ende schlecht, alles gut (1934) - Businessman
 Bretter, die die Welt bedeuten (1935) - Traeger, Theateragent
 Affairs of Maupassant (1935) - Excellenz
 Il diario di una donna amata (1935)
 Catherine the Last (1936) - Exzellenz
 Shipwrecked Max (1936) - Köhler
 Chéri-Bibi (1938) - Boris
 The Shanghai Drama (1938) - Le faussaire (uncredited)
 Gibraltar (1938) - (uncredited)
 Three Waltzes (1938) - Le producteur
 Man Hunt (1941) - Little Fat Man (uncredited)
 It Started with Eve (1941) - Sigoni (uncredited)
 To Be or Not to Be (1942) - Prompter (uncredited)
 Between Us Girls (1942) - Ambassador (uncredited)
 Once Upon a Honeymoon (1942) - French Waiter (uncredited)
 Reunion in France (1942) - Hawker (uncredited)
 Mission to Moscow (1943) - Bookseller (uncredited)
 Above Suspicion (1943) - Museum Guide (uncredited)
 Hitler's Madman (1943) - Doctor (uncredited)
 Phantom Lady (1944) - Max - Proprietor (uncredited)
 The White Cliffs of Dover (1944) - Frenchman at Dieppe Train Station (uncredited)
 Days of Glory (1944) - Anton (uncredited)
 The Mask of Dimitrios (1944) - Bulgarian Cafe Proprietor (uncredited)
 The Seventh Cross (1944) - S.A. Guard (uncredited) (final film role)

References

Further reading

External links 
 

1876 births
1944 deaths
German male film actors
German male silent film actors
20th-century German male actors
German film directors
Russian male film actors
Russian film directors
Russian people of Jewish descent
Emigrants from the Russian Empire to Germany
Jewish emigrants from Nazi Germany to the United States